Sekhukhune United F.C. is a South African soccer club from Kempton Park, Ekurhuleni (Gauteng) that plays in the DStv Premiership.

Players

Achievements
2020–21 National First Division champions

References

External links
 

Soccer clubs in Gauteng
Kempton Park, Gauteng